Shack-man is an album by experimental jazz fusion trio Medeski Martin & Wood, released in 1996.

It peaked at #7 on the Billboard Contemporary Jazz Albums chart.

Production
The album was recorded in an isolated shack in Hawaii, with power supplied by solar energy and generators.

Critical reception
AllMusic called the album "the best example to date of the trio's cerebral fusion of soul-jazz, hip-hop, and post-punk worldbeat." New York wrote that "the changes are episodic, as in funk, rather than conversational, as in jazz." Relix called it a "dark, funky dorm room breakthrough."

The Cleveland Scene wrote that the group "made it cool to groove again with 1996's Shack Man, a Hammond-hammered Phish-lot mainstay that opened the door for instrumental improv groups like Soulive and Particle."

Track listing
All music by Medeski Martin & Wood except where noted.

"Is There Anybody Here That Love My Jesus" (traditional, arr. by MMW) – 4:27
"Think" – 5:16
"Dracula" – 4:16
"Bubblehouse" – 4:27
"Henduck" – 4:38
"Strance of the Spirit Red Gator" – 7:06
"Spy Kiss" – 4:22
"Lifeblood" – 7:06
"Jelly Belly" – 4:42
"Night Marchers" – 4:26
"Kenny" – 4:43

Performers
John Medeski – Hammond B3 organ, clavinet, Wurlitzer electric piano, Pianet T, toy piano, Yamaha CSO1 II
Billy Martin – drums, percussion
Chris Wood – acoustic bass, electric basses, guitar

Credits
Recording engineer: David Baker
Assisted by Carl Green and Mark Kindermann
Mixed at IIWII, Weehawken, NJ with David Baker and Katsu Naito
Edited at Current Sounds, NYC with Bob Ward
Mastered by Dr. Toby Mountain, Northeastern Digital Recording
Executive producer: Hans Wendl
LP management: Liz Penta
Band photo by Michael Macioce
Artwork by Billy Martin, 1996

References

1996 albums
Medeski Martin & Wood albums
Gramavision Records albums